Monroe County Airport  is a county-owned, public-use airport in Monroe County, Mississippi, United States. It is located four nautical miles (5 mi, 7 km) northeast of the central business district of Aberdeen and south of Amory. This airport is included in the National Plan of Integrated Airport Systems for 2011–2015, which categorized it as a general aviation facility.

Facilities and aircraft 
Monroe County Airport covers an area of 420 acres (170 ha) at an elevation of 226 feet (69 m) above mean sea level. It has one runway designated 18/36 with an asphalt surface measuring 4,999 by 75 feet (1,524 x 23 m).

For the 12-month period ending November 29, 2011, the airport had 11,865 general aviation aircraft operations, an average of 32 per day. At that time there were 32 aircraft based at this airport: 69% single-engine, 16% glider, 12% multi-engine, and 3% jet.

See also 
 List of airports in Mississippi

References

External links 
 Airport page at Monroe County website
 Aerial image as of February 1996 from USGS The National Map
 
 

Airports in Mississippi
Buildings and structures in Monroe County, Mississippi
Transportation in Monroe County, Mississippi